Firewall may refer to:
 Firewall (computing), a technological barrier designed to prevent unauthorized or unwanted communications between computer networks or hosts
 Firewall (construction), a barrier inside a building, designed to limit the spread of fire, heat and structural collapse
 Firewall (engine), the part of a vehicle that separates the engine compartment from the rest of the vehicle
 Firewall (physics), a hypothetical phenomenon where a freely falling observer spontaneously burns up at the horizon of a black hole

Arts, entertainment, and media

Music 

 Firewall, an alias of British musician Lange (born 1974)
 "Firewall", a song by Steve Vai from the 2005 album Real Illusions: Reflections
 "Firewall", a song by Kompany from the 2019 extended play Metropolis

Literature
 Firewall (Andy McNab novel), a Nick Stone adventure
 Firewall (Mankell novel), a 1998 novel by Henning Mankell, featuring Kurt Walland

Film and television 

 Firewall (film), a 2006 thriller film written by Joe Forte, starring Harrison Ford
 "Firewall" (Person of Interest), an episode of the American television drama series Person of Interest
 "Firewall", an episode from the Canadian computer animated series ReBoot

Characters 

 Firewall, a fictional character in the G.I. Joe universe

See also
 Alberta Agenda, also known as the Alberta Firewall, a political proposal for the Canadian province
 firewalld, a firewall management tool for Linux operating systems
 Great Firewall, China's internet censorship firewall
 Chinese wall, a zone of non-communication between distinct sections of a business, in order to prevent conflicts of interest
 Personal firewall, a very popular form of firewall designed to protect personal computers
 Reredos, a short wall behind a fire in a traditional hearth
 Wall of Fire (disambiguation)